The 1951–52 Hong Kong First Division League season was the 41st since its establishment.

League table

References
1951–52 Hong Kong First Division table (RSSSF)

Hong Kong First Division League seasons
Hong
football